McCargo is a surname. Notable people with the surname include:

Aaron McCargo, Jr. (born 1971), American chef
Brian McCargo, Northern Irish police officer
Duncan McCargo, British academic
John McCargo (born 1983), American football player
Marian McCargo (1932–2004), American tennis player and actor